Manmohan Malhoutra is a former Indian diplomat and Assistant Secretary-General of the Commonwealth of Nations.

Malhoutra studied history at University of Delhi where he won a Rhodes Scholarship to the Balliol College, Oxford.  He entered the Indian Administrative Service in 1961 and between 1966 and 1974 served in the office of the Indian Prime Minister as a foreign policy and environmental issue advisor to Indira Gandhi. In 1975 he became Special Assistant to the Commonwealth Secretary-General and in 1977 the Director and Head of both the Secretary-General's Office and the International Affairs Division.

Prior to Zimbabwe's independence in 1980 he led the Commonwealth Secretariat team which monitored Zimbabwe's pre-independence elections, and through the Commonwealth Eminent Persons Group between 1982 and 1993 he was active in applying political pressure in the removal of the apartheid regime in South Africa.

He is a former treasurer of International Institute for Democracy and Electoral Assistance and is currently Secretary-General of the Rajiv Gandhi Foundation, a funding institute for social welfare programs in India.

He is the editor of "India: The Next Decade" (2006)

External links
International Institute for Democracy and Electoral Assistance (IDEA)
New Secretary - General for the Rajiv Gandhi Foundation Rajiv Gandhi Institute for Contemporary Studies

Indian Rhodes Scholars
Indian civil servants
Alumni of Balliol College, Oxford
Delhi University alumni
Living people
Year of birth missing (living people)